Sir Thomas Lovell (by 1528 – 23 March 1567) was an English politician.

He was a Member (MP) of the Parliament of England for Midhurst in October 1553.

References

1567 deaths
English MPs 1553 (Mary I)
Year of birth uncertain